Suzannah Clark (b February 3, 1969) is a Canadian-British musicologist and music theorist specializing in the music of Franz Schubert, the history of music theory, and medieval music. She is currently Morton B. Knafel Professor of Music and in 2019 was named Harvard College Professor at Harvard University and from 2016–2019 served as chair of the Music Department at Harvard.

Biography and research
Clark grew up in Newfoundland, Canada and England. Educated at King's College London, Princeton University, and the Humboldt University Berlin, she took up a Junior Research Fellowship, and then a British Academy Research Fellowship at Merton College Oxford. Between 2000 and 2008 she taught at the Faculty of Music at Oxford University. In 2008 she moved to Harvard University, where she had first taught as a visiting professor the previous year.

Clark’s main research has focused on Schubert analysis. Originally beginning with an analysis of the harmonically symmetrical properties of his instrumental forms, Clark’s study soon encompassed the forms of Schubert’s songs as well. Her interest in the properties of diatonicism and tonal spaces has also fed much of her work in the history of music theory, notably in her studies of Arthur von Oettingen and Heinrich Schenker. Clark’s work on medieval music originally focused on the music of the thirteenth century, the trouvères, the genre of refrains, but now centers broadly on questions of textuality, performance, and musical analysis.

Clark serves on the advisory boards of Music Analysis and Nineteenth-Century Music Review, and she was an associate director of the Digital Image Archive of Medieval Music (DIAMM). She was Reviews Editor for the Journal of the American Musicological Society.

Select publications
 Citation and Authority in Medieval and Early Renaissance Musical Culture: Learning from the Learned (co-edited with Elizabeth Eva Leach, London: Boydell, 2005)
 Music Theory and Natural Order from the Renaissance to the Early Twentieth Century (co-edited with Alexander Rehding, Cambridge: Cambridge University Press, 2001, pbk 2005)
 “Schenker’s Mysterious Five” Nineteenth Century Music (1999)
 “Schubert, Theory, and Analysis” Music Analysis (2001)
 “The politics of the Urlinie in Schenker’s Der Tonwille and Der freie Satz“ Journal of the RMA (2007)
 “‘S’en dirai chançonete’: hearing text and music in a medieval motet" Plainsong and Medieval Music (2007)
 Analyzing Schubert Cambridge University Press (2011)

References

External links
 Harvard University, Department of Music
 Merton College Oxford
 Digital Image Archive of Medieval Music

1969 births
Living people
Alumni of King's College London
Princeton University alumni
Harvard University faculty
Canadian academics